The Goupy Type A was an staggered biplane designed by Ambroise Goupy in the early 1910s.

Design
The Goupy Type A was a staggered biplane. The similar Goupy Type AA was powered by an Anzani engine.

Specifications

References 

1910s French experimental aircraft
Goupy aircraft
Rotary-engined aircraft
Biplanes